The Two Blind Men was a 1900 French short silent film by Georges Méliès. It was sold by Méliès's Star Film Company and is numbered 283 in its catalogues.

The film is currently presumed lost. However, a film still does survive of one scene, with Méliès standing second from right, playing one of the characters.

References

External links

1900 films
French silent short films
French black-and-white films
Films directed by Georges Méliès
Lost French films